The 2010 congressional elections in Maryland were held on November 2, 2010, to determine who will represent the state of Maryland in the United States House of Representatives. Maryland has eight seats in the House, apportioned according to the 2000 United States Census. Representatives are elected for two-year terms; those elected served in the 112th Congress from January 3, 2011 until January 3, 2013. The party primaries were held September 14, 2010.

As of 2021, this is the last time that Republicans won more than one congressional district in Maryland.

Overview

|- style="background-color: #e9e9e9; font-weight: bold;"
! scope="row" colspan="2" style="text-align: right;" | Totals
| style="text-align: right;" | 8
| style="text-align: right;" | 1
| style="text-align: right;" | 1
| style="text-align: right;" | —
| style="text-align: right;" | 100%
| style="text-align: right;" | 100%
| style="text-align: right;" | 1,825,472
| style="text-align: right;" |
|}

By district
Results of the 2010 United States House of Representatives elections in Maryland by district:

District 1

The district encompasses the entire Eastern Shore of Maryland, as well as parts of Anne Arundel, Baltimore and Harford Counties.

Incumbent Democrat Frank Kratovil ran for re-election against Republican State Senator Andy Harris. Libertarian Richard Davis and Independent Jack Wilson also ran.
 MD - District 1 from OurCampaigns.com
 Race ranking and details from CQ Politics
 Campaign contributions from OpenSecrets
 Race profile at The New York Times

† Internal poll for Kratovil campaign

District 2

The district comprises parts of Harford, Baltimore, and Anne Arundel Counties, as well as small portions of the City of Baltimore, and has been represented by Democrat Dutch Ruppersberger since 2003; he ran for re-election against Republican Marcelo Cardarelli, a physician.
 Race ranking and details from CQ Politics
 Campaign contributions from OpenSecrets
 Race profile at The New York Times

District 3

This gerrymandered district comprises portions of Baltimore, Howard and Anne Arundel counties, as well as a significant part of the independent city of Baltimore, and was represented by Democrat John Sarbanes since 2007.  Sarbanes is the son of former Maryland Senator Paul Sarbanes. His Republican opponent was Jim Wilhelm.
 Race ranking and details from CQ Politics
 Campaign contributions from OpenSecrets
 profile at The New York Times

District 4

The district comprises portions of Prince George's and Montgomery Counties, and was represented by Democrat Donna Edwards. She ran for re-election against Republican Robert Broadus.
 Race ranking and details from CQ Politics
 Campaign contributions from OpenSecrets
 Race profile at The New York Times

District 5

The district comprises all of Charles, St. Mary's, and Calvert Counties, as well as portions of Prince George's and Anne Arundel Counties.  The seat had been represented by Democrat and House Majority Leader Steny Hoyer since 1981. He was challenged by Republican Charles Lollar, the Chairman of the Charles County Republican Party, and Libertarian H. Gavin Shickle.
 Race ranking and details from CQ Politics
 Campaign contributions from OpenSecrets
 Race profile at The New York Times

District 6

The district comprises all of Garrett, Allegany, Washington, Frederick and Carroll Counties, as well as portions of Montgomery, Baltimore, and Harford Counties, and had been represented by Republican Roscoe Bartlett since 1993. Democrat Andrew J. Duck challenged Roscoe Bartlett in 2010.
 Race ranking and details from CQ Politics
 Campaign contributions from OpenSecrets
 Race profile at The New York Times

District 7

The district encompasses parts of Baltimore City, Baltimore County, and Howard County, and had been represented by Democrat Elijah Cummings since 1996. He was challenged for re-election by Republican Frank Mirabile.
 Race ranking and details from CQ Politics
 Campaign contributions from OpenSecrets
 Race profile at The New York Times

District 8

The district mostly consists of the larger part of Montgomery County, but also includes a small portion of Prince George's County, and had been represented by Democrat Chris Van Hollen since 2003. He was challenged by Republican Michael Lee Philips.
 Race ranking and details from CQ Politics
 Campaign contributions from OpenSecrets
 Race profile at The New York Times

References

External links
 Maryland State Board of Elections
 Official candidate list
 U.S. Congress candidates for Maryland at Project Vote Smart
 Maryland U.S. House from OurCampaigns.com
 Campaign contributions for U.S. Congressional races in Maryland from OpenSecrets
 2010 Maryland General Election graph of multiple polls from Pollster.com

 House - Maryland from The Cook Political Report

 Candidate blogs at The Baltimore Sun

United States House of Representatives
2010
Maryland